Manilkara is a genus of trees in the family Sapotaceae. They are widespread in tropical and semitropical locations, in Africa, Madagascar, Asia, Australia, and Latin America, as well as various islands in the Pacific and in the Caribbean. A close relative is the genus Pouteria.

Trees of this genus yield edible fruit, useful wood, and latex. The best-known species are M. bidentata (balatá), M. chicle (chicle) and M. zapota (sapodilla). M. hexandra is the floral emblem of Prachuap Khiri Khan Province in Thailand, where it is known as rayan. M. obovata shares the vernacular name of African pear with another completely different species, Dacryodes edulis, and neither should be confused with Baillonella toxisperma, known by the very similar name, African pearwood.

The generic name, Manilkara, is derived from manil-kara, a vernacular name for M. kauki in Malayalam.

Manilkara trees are often significant, or even dominant species in their native ecosystems, such as East Deccan dry evergreen forests, Central American premontane tropical wet forests, or together with Cynometra, in the Arabuko Sokoke National Park.

Manilkara fruit are an important food item for various frugivores, in particular birds. The red fruit bat (Stenoderma rufum) is the primary – and possibly the only – seed disperser of M. bidentata in parts of the Caribbean.  Tuckerella xiamenensis, a species of peacock mite, was described from a sapodilla tree.

Several species are endangered due to overexploitation and habitat destruction. M. gonavensis of Haiti and M. spectabilis of Costa Rica are almost extinct.

Species
Species accepted by the Plants of the World Online as of December 2022: 

Manilkara adolfi-friederici 
Manilkara bequaertii 
Manilkara bidentata 
Manilkara boivinii 
Manilkara bolivarensis 
Manilkara butugi 
Manilkara capuronii 
Manilkara casteelsii 
Manilkara cavalcantei 
Manilkara celebica 
Manilkara chicle 
Manilkara concolor 
Manilkara dardanoi 
Manilkara dawei 
Manilkara decrescens 
Manilkara discolor 
Manilkara dissecta 
Manilkara doeringii 
Manilkara dukensis 
Manilkara elata 
Manilkara excelsa 
Manilkara excisa 
Manilkara fasciculata 
Manilkara fischeri 
Manilkara fouilloyana 
Manilkara frondosa 
Manilkara gonavensis 
Manilkara hexandra 
Manilkara hoshinoi 
Manilkara huberi 
Manilkara ilendensis 
Manilkara inundata 
Manilkara jaimiqui 
Manilkara kanosiensis 
Manilkara kauki 
Manilkara koechlinii 
Manilkara kribensis 
Manilkara kurziana 
Manilkara letestui 
Manilkara letouzeyi 
Manilkara littoralis 
Manilkara longifolia 
Manilkara longistyla 
Manilkara lososiana 
Manilkara mabokeensis 
Manilkara maxima 
Manilkara mayarensis 
Manilkara microphylla 
Manilkara mochisia 
Manilkara multifida 
Manilkara nicholsonii 
Manilkara obovata 
Manilkara paraensis 
Manilkara pellegriniana 
Manilkara perrieri 
Manilkara pleeana 
Manilkara pobeguinii 
Manilkara pubicarpa 
Manilkara roxburghiana 
Manilkara rufula 
Manilkara sahafarensis 
Manilkara salzmannii 
Manilkara samoensis 
Manilkara sansibarensis 
Manilkara seretii 
Manilkara sideroxylon 
Manilkara smithiana 
Manilkara spectabilis 
Manilkara staminodella 
Manilkara suarezensis 
Manilkara subsericea 
Manilkara sulcata 
Manilkara sylvestris 
Manilkara triflora 
Manilkara udoido 
Manilkara valenzuelana 
Manilkara vitiensis 
Manilkara zapota 
Manilkara zenkeri

References

 
Sapotaceae genera